Rhine Creek is a stream in the U.S. state of Minnesota.

The name may be a corruption of Ryan Creek, an earlier name appearing on maps.

See also
List of rivers of Minnesota

References

Rivers of Pine County, Minnesota
Rivers of Minnesota